Tim Harrod (born May 25, 1968) is an American comedy writer and actor, known for Late Night with Conan O'Brien, The Onion, 58th Primetime Emmy Awards, and Golden Age (2006 film).

The Early years 

Harrod acted with the improvisational franchise ComedySportz, in Ann Arbor, Michigan 1987–1989.  He acted with the West Bloomfield, Michigan Comedy Sports in 1991–92.  He also worked extensively in stand-up comedy, in a two-person act with Tim Pryor (a member of the first cast of Second City, Detroit, and a ComedySportz veteran).

Filmography

Writer

 The Onion's Extremely Accurate History of the Internet (2012)
 Late Night with Conan O'Brien (2005–2007)
 Golden Age (2007)
 The 58th Annual Primetime Emmy Awards (2006)

Actor

 Star Wars: Tremors of the Force (2014)
 Golden Age (2007)
 Late Night with Conan O'Brien (2005–2007)
 The Astounding World of the Future (2001)

Appearance

  The Aristocrats With Onion staffers; Harrod makes the joke about Jesus performing in blackface (2005)

References

External links
 

1968 births
Living people
The Onion people
American comedy writers